The Northside is the part of Dublin city that lies to the north of the River Liffey. It is an informal but commonly used term. While it is sometimes regarded as less wealthy than the city's Southside, the Northside was originally the home of the city's upper classes and the more privileged of the two. Today, some of the wealthiest areas in Ireland lie north of the river, such as Malahide, Howth, Clontarf, and Castleknock.

Definition 
Not an administrative area, the Northside is variously defined. It generally includes those parts of Dublin city that lie north of the River Liffey. County Dublin settlements, north of the M50 motorway, such as Swords and Malahide, which have developed into suburbs of Dublin city, are usually included.

Popular culture
James Joyce set several of the Dubliners stories on the Northside, reflecting his childhood sojourns in Drumcondra and Fairview. Among the more recent best-selling writers to have written extensively about the Northside are Dermot Bolger and Booker Prize winner Roddy Doyle, who set several of his novels in the fictional Northside area of Barrytown.

The soap opera Fair City is set in Carrigstown, a fictional suburb within Dublin's Northside. According to the RTÉ Guide, Carrigstown is bounded by Drumcondra to the north, the city centre to the south, East Wall to the east and Phibsboro to the west.

Areas of the Northside 
The Northside includes Dublin city centre north of the Liffey, of whose many streets some are noted below, and districts such as Smithfield and Summerhill.  Some older districts, such as Oxmantown, no longer exist.  Beyond the centre, areas of the Northside include the below, most (at least two names were invented in the 1960s) of the names being of long heritage, though until recently many were rural townlands. Some are distinct suburbs or villages, others are parts of larger areas:

Artane
Arbour Hill
Ashtown
Balbriggan
Ballybough
Ballyboughal
Baldoyle
Balgriffin
Ballygall
Ballymun
Bayside
Beaumont
Blanchardstown
Broadstone
Cabra
Castleknock
Clonee
Clongriffin
Clonsilla
Clontarf
Coolock
Corduff
Darndale
Dollymount
Donabate
Donaghmede
Donnycarney
Drumcondra
East Wall
Fairview
Finglas
Glasnevin
Grangegorman
Harmonstown
Howth
Kilbarrack
Killester
Kilmore
Kinsealy
Malahide
Marino
Mulhuddart
North Wall
North Strand
Ongar
Oxmantown
Phibsboro
Portmarnock
Priorswood
Raheny
Santry
Sheriff Street
Skerries
Smithfield
Stoneybatter
Strawberry Beds
Sutton
Summerhill
Swords
Tyrellstown
Whitehall.

The 'area' is administered both by Dublin City Council (formerly Dublin Corporation) and Fingal County Council,  responsible for 84% and 16% of the land area which lies inside the M50 motorway and north of the river Liffey respectively (excluding the Howth peninsula).

Postcodes 
Traditionally, Dublin postal districts on the Northside begin with odd numbers, while those on the Southside begin with even numbers. O'Connell Street, for example, is in the city's D01 district—simply called "Dublin 1" in everyday speech—whereas the outer suburb of Ballymun is in D11. One exception is the Phoenix Park, which is on the Northside but forms part of the even-numbered district D08. The reason behind this is explained by historian Pat Liddy: "Long before there were postal codes, the James's Street Postal Sorting Office looked after the Phoenix Park, because it was considered to be closer and more convenient than Phibsborough. James's Street continued in this role when the postal codes were introduced, so Dublin 8 it had to be." Another apparent quirk of the postal district system on the Northside is that the town of Clonee in Dublin's neighbouring County Meath actually lies within the city's D15 postal code. 

The outer edges of the Northside and all of North County Dublin also contain all but one of the newer "K" Dublin postcode areas. These are separate from the traditional postal districts but have been unified with them under the new Eircode system. Swords, for example, is in Dublin K67, whereas Malahide is in the K36 area. The single exception to the rule is Lucan, which is in south-west Dublin and is designated as Dublin K78. Since Eircode was implemented, Northside postal addresses now take two general forms, depending on whether they lie within the traditional postal district area or not. This is an example of a postal address within the traditional Dublin postal districts: 

 The Gresham Hotel, 
 23 Upper O'Connell Street,
 Dublin 1,
 D01 C3W7.

And this is an example of a Northside postal address from outside the traditional postal districts: 

 Coffee Works
 62 Main Street
 Swords, 
 County Dublin,
 K67 RX94.

Landmarks 

Well known places and sights on the Northside include:

Abbey Street
Abbey Theatre, the Irish National Theatre
Ambassador Theatre
Áras an Uachtaráin, the residence of the President
Arbour Hill Prison
Beaumont Hospital
Blessington Street Basin
Bull Island 
Dollymount
Capel Street
Casino at Marino
Castleknock Castle
Clontarf Castle
Croke Park
Dalymount Park
Dublin City Gallery The Hugh Lane
Dublin City University
Dublin Port 
Dublin Port Tunnel
Dublin Writers Museum
Dublin Zoo
Dunsink Observatory
Dorset Street
Dunsink Observatory
Farmleigh
Four Courts
Garden of Remembrance
Gardiner Street
Gate Theatre
GPO
Glasnevin Cemetery
Grangegorman Military Cemetery
Henrietta Street
Henry Street 
Howth Castle
Howth Head
International Financial Services Centre
Irish Writers Centre
James Joyce Centre
King's Inns
Law Society of Ireland
Malahide Castle and regional park
Mater Hospital
Morton Stadium
Moore Street
Mountjoy Prison
Mountjoy Square
National Aquatic Centre
National Botanic Gardens
National Museum of Ireland (Collins Museum)
National Transport Museum of Ireland
North Circular Road
O'Connell Street
Old Jameson Whiskey Distillery
Parnell Square
Parnell Street
Phoenix Park
Rotunda Hospital
Royal Canal
Smithfield
Spire of Dublin
Saint Anne's Park
St. Brendan's Hospital, Dublin
St. Doulagh's Church
St. Mary's Church
St. Mary's Hospital (Phoenix Park)
St Mary's Pro-Cathedral
St. Michan's Church
Swords Castle
Talbot Street
The Custom House
The Helix
Tolka Park
Wellington Monument
3Arena

Major transport hubs include Connolly Station, Busáras (the national central bus station) and Dublin Airport.

A number of state bodies are based on the Northside, including the national meteorological office, Met Éireann, the Central Fisheries Board, the national enterprise and trade board, Enterprise Ireland, the National Standards Authority of Ireland, Sustainable Energy Authority of Ireland, the Department of Education and Skills, the Department of the Environment, Community and Local Government, the Marine Institute in Corduff and the Department of Defence.

The main shopping area in the north inner city, and busiest shopping street in Ireland, is Henry Street/Mary Street, just off O'Connell street. Three of the five city centre shopping centres are located on the Northside, these are the Jervis Centre, the Ilac Shopping Centre / Moore Street Mall, and the Irish Life Shopping Mall, along with Dublin's largest out-of-town centre, at Blanchardstown, and others at Swords, Coolock, Charlestown in northern Finglas, and Donaghmede.

The Cineworld (UGC) cinema on Parnell Street is the largest cinema in Ireland with seventeen screens, while the Savoy, located on O'Connell Street and operated by IMC, is one of Ireland's oldest cinemas.

Higher education institutions include the Grangegorman Campus of Technological University Dublin, the newest university established in Dublin, and Dublin City University, with its campus located primarily in Glasnevin and Drumcondra.

See also 

 Southside, Dublin 
List of Eircode routing areas in Ireland

References

Sub-divisions of County Dublin